Joseph A. Meyers (born September 13, 1860 in Milwaukee) was a stonecutter from Milwaukee, Wisconsin who served one term as a People's Party member of the Wisconsin State Assembly from Milwaukee.

Background 
Meyers was born in the city of  Milwaukee, September 13, 1860; received a common school education, and became a stonecutter. He lived in Indianapolis in 1880; in Chicago briefly in 1881; and in Minneapolis, Minnesota for part of 1883–1884, before returning to his native city. Milwaukee's city Board of Public Works appointed him superintendent of new public schools on October 3, 1886.

Legislative service
Meyers was elected to the Assembly for Milwaukee's Sixth Assembly District (the sixth and thirteenth wards of the City of Milwaukee) in 1886 on the Populist ticket, receiving 2,252 votes against 1,217 votes for Republican Paul Vogt; incumbent John Lagrand (a Republican) was not on the ballot. Meyers was assigned to the standing committee on Federal Relations. He was not a candidate for re-election in 1888, being succeeded by Republican Christopher Raesser.

Personal life 
At the time of his election, he was single.

References 

1860 births
American stonemasons
Members of the Wisconsin State Assembly
Politicians from Milwaukee
Wisconsin Laborites
Year of death missing